Douglas Green (19 May 1902 – 28 November 1990) was an Australian cricketer. He played 25 first-class matches for Tasmania between 1924 and 1937.

A determined batsman with a "rock-like defence" Doug Green's highest score was 150 not out, when, captaining Tasmania, he saved them from defeat against Victoria in 1932-33, batting throughout the last day's play to erase a 269-run first-innings deficit.

See also
 List of Tasmanian representative cricketers

References

External links
 

1902 births
1990 deaths
Australian cricketers
Tasmania cricketers
Cricketers from Hobart